Representative Comstock may refer to:

 Barbara Comstock (1959-), U.S. Representative from Virginia
 Solomon Comstock (1842-1933), U.S. Representative from Minnesota
 Daniel Webster Comstock (1840–1917), U.S. Representative from Indiana
 Joseph Comstock, member of the House of Representatives of the Colony of Connecticut 
 Frank Comstock (politician) (1856-1914), Connecticut state Representative
 Samuel Comstock (1680-1752), Connecticut state Representative

See also
 Comstock (surname)